Kalinovo is a rural locality (a selo) and the administrative center of Kalinovskoye Rural Settlement, Krasnogvardeysky District, Belgorod Oblast, Russia. The population was 563 as of 2010. There are 6 streets.

Geography 
Kalinovo is located 22 km south of Biryuch (the district's administrative centre) by road. Popasnoye is the nearest rural locality.

References 

Rural localities in Krasnogvardeysky District, Belgorod Oblast